Kolno was a  cargo ship that was built in 1936 as Nordcoke by Lübecker Flenderwerke AG, Lübeck, Germany. In 1940, she was requisitioned by the Kriegsmarine and was renamed Nordlicht. In 1945, she was seized by the Allies at Hamburg, passed to the Ministry of War Transport (MoWT) and was renamed Empire Conwear. In 1946, she was passed to the Soviet Union and renamed Armavir (ru. Армавир). In 1947, she was sold to Poland and renamed Kolno. She served until 1971 when she ran aground off Falsterbo, Sweden, following which she served as a hulk until scrapped in 1983.

Description
The ship was built in 1936 by Lübecker Flenderwerke AG, Lübeck. She was completed in December of that year.

The ship was propelled by a compound steam engine which had two cylinders of 20 inches (51 cm) and two cylinders of 43 inches  (110 cm) diameter by 43 inches (110 cm) stroke. The engine was built by Lübecker Flenderwerke.

Most notable for a ship of her time is, that Nordcoke was equipped with large-scale hatch openings, which measured 10 by 10 metres, covered by steel hatch covers. The background of this new system was a faster handling of her cargoes, mainly coal and iron ore by means like mechanical grabs and further time-saving during opening and closing of those folding-type steel covers.

History
Nordcoke was built for F Krupp, Essen. Her port of registry was Hamburg and the Code Letters DJSI were allocated. She was operated under the management of Norddeutsche Kohlen- und Koks Werke AG. In 1940, she was requisitioned by the Kriegsmarine and was renamed Nordlicht.

In May 1945, Nordlicht was captured by the Allies at Hamburg. She was passed to the MoWT and renamed Empire Conwear. She was operated under the management of James Westoll Ltd. Her port of registry was London. In 1946, she was allocated to the Soviet Union and was renamed Armavir. Her port of registry was Archangelsk.

In 1947, she was sold to Żegluga Polska Line and was renamed Kolno. Her port of registry was changed to Szczecin, and the Code Letters SPFB were allocated. On 14 March 1967, Kolno was in collision with the Danish cargo ship  in the Odense River. On 7 January 1970, Kolno ran aground off Falsterbo, Sweden. She was subsequently rebuilt for use as a floating boilerhouse and based at Świnoujście until she was scrapped in April 1983.

References

Further reading

1936 ships
Ships built in Lübeck
Steamships of Germany
Merchant ships of Germany
World War II merchant ships of Germany
Auxiliary ships of the Kriegsmarine
Ministry of War Transport ships
Empire ships
Steamships of the United Kingdom
Merchant ships of the United Kingdom
Steamships of the Soviet Union
Merchant ships of the Soviet Union
Steamships of Poland
Merchant ships of Poland
Maritime incidents in 1967
Maritime incidents in 1970
Ships sunk with no fatalities